Triple header or variant thereof, may refer to:

Baseball tripleheader, three baseball games on the same day between the same two teams, see Doubleheader (baseball)#Tripleheaders
Television tripleheader, three telecast games in the same sport televised back-to-back, see Doubleheader (television)
Triple-header, a train that has been triple-headed through triple-heading a train, see Double-heading
Penzoil/VIP Tripleheader, NASCAR race, former name of the UNOH 175
"Triple Header", a 1983 story of The Railway Series book "Really Useful Engines"